Cho Hae is a tambon (sub-district) of Mueang Phrae District, Phrae Province, northern Thailand.

Naming
Its name after Phra That Cho Hae (พระธาตุช่อแฮ), a local ancient stūpa is highly revered and regarded as the symbol of the province of Phrae. This stūpa is believed to be the pagoda of the people who were born in the Year of the Tiger, according to the beliefs of the Lanna people since ancient times.

Geography
Adjoining sub-districts are (from the north clockwise): Pa Daeng in its district, Pa Daeng in its district, Charim in Tha Pla District of Uttaradit Province, Ban Kwang in Sung Men District, respectively.

Administration
Cho Hae is governed by Subdistrict-Municipality Cho Hae (เทศบาลตำบลช่อแฮ), which covers the other 4 mubans (village) in neighbouring sub-district, Pa Daeng as well.

Cho Hae also consists of 10 administrative villages

Places of interest
In addition to Phra That Cho Hae, the sub-district also has other interesting places especially as Ban Na Tong, a small village in the midst of mountains and flowing Mae Gon creek. There is the Ban Na Tong Museum exhibiting prehistoric human skeletons as well as human appliances from that period unearthed in local cave. 

Wat Tham Mueang also known as Wat Na Tong is one of the oldest and most important temples in the local area.

Moreover, this village is also a conservation area for big-headed turtle (Platysternon megacephalum), an endangered long-tailed freshwater turtle found only in mountain streams in northern Thailand to southern China and northern of some countries in mainland Southeast Asia. Two turtle ponds are open to visitors and allowed to touch the turtles.

Local products
Quilt
Bedspread

References

Tambon of Phrae Province